Kacper Tobiasz (born 4 November 2002) is a Polish professional footballer who plays as a goalkeeper for Ekstraklasa side Legia Warsaw.

Club career

Stomil Olsztyn
On 25 February 2022, Legia Warsaw agreed to loan Tobiasz to I liga club Stomil Olsztyn. He made his debut on 26 February in a 1–1 draw away to Korona Kielce at the Municipal Stadium.

Career statistics

Club

Notes

References

2002 births
Living people
Sportspeople from Płock
Polish footballers
Association football goalkeepers
Poland youth international footballers
Poland under-21 international footballers
Ekstraklasa players
III liga players
I liga players
Legia Warsaw players
Legia Warsaw II players
OKS Stomil Olsztyn players